Sarangesa pandaensis is a species of butterfly in the family Hesperiidae. It is found in Angola, the Democratic Republic of the Congo and Zambia. The habitat consists of Brachystegia woodland.

Subspecies
Sarangesa pandaensis pandaensis - Angola, southern Democratic Republic of Congo
Sarangesa pandaensis deningi Evans, 1956 - northern Zambia

References

Butterflies described in 1921
Celaenorrhinini